The Auster J/1U Workmaster is a late 1950s British single-engined single-seat high-wing agricultural monoplane built by Auster Aircraft Limited at Rearsby, Leicestershire. Of traditional high-wing layout, it carries 90 gallons of spray fluid in a tank beside the pilot, an extra seat being provided for a passenger. The Lycoming 0-360-A engine of 180 h.p. driving a McCauley v.p. propeller giving it ample power; and slotted ailerons and balanced tail controls providing good handling. Oversize tyres were fitted. Britten-Norman spray gear was provided by Crop Culture, and this company ordered nine Workmasters.

History
Following the experience of developing the J/1B Aiglet agricultural aircraft, Auster developed a more powerful successor the J/1U Workmaster. Using the basic Autocrat fuselage it was strengthened and had dorsal fin fillets added, low pressure tyres and a 180 hp (134 kW) Avco Lycoming engine.

 
The aircraft were fitted with Britten-Norman rotary atomizers for crop spraying and a 100 imperial gallon (455 litre) chemical tank in the fuselage. An emergency dump valve allowed the tank to be emptied in 5 seconds. The Workmasters were mainly operated in West Africa, three later returning and are currently (2009) on the U.K. civil aircraft register.

Specifications (J/1U)

References

Further reading

External links
 Auster Workmaster promotional brochure (PDF)

High-wing aircraft
Single-engined tractor aircraft
1950s British agricultural aircraft
Auster aircraft
Aircraft first flown in 1958
1950s British aircraft